James Hendry may refer to:

 James Hendry (obstetrician) (1885–1945), Regius Professor of Midwifery at the University of Glasgow
 James Hendry (footballer), Scottish footballer
 James Hendry (GC) (1911–1941)
 James Hendry (moderator) (1852–1927), moderator of the General Assembly of the Free Church of Scotland, 1909